The Sparta Free Library is located in Sparta, Wisconsin. It was added to the National Register of Historic Places in 1981.

History
Prior to the construction of this building, the Sparta Free Library was housed in multiple buildings. The funds to build the structure were provided by Andrew Carnegie.

References

Library buildings completed in 1902
Government buildings completed in 1902
Libraries on the National Register of Historic Places in Wisconsin
Carnegie libraries in Wisconsin
Buildings and structures in Monroe County, Wisconsin
Neoclassical architecture in Wisconsin
National Register of Historic Places in Monroe County, Wisconsin